is a Japanese screenwriter and producer of anime from Saitama, Japan.

Anime staff in
 Tenchi Muyo Movie 3: Tenchi Forever (1999 film), Opticals
 Kanon (TV series) (2002 TV series), Storyboard (Ep 7, 8, 11), Series Story Editor
 Mizuiro (2003 OVA), Scenario (Vol.2)
 Air (2005 film), Screenplay
 The Snow Queen (2005 TV series), Script
 Koi suru Tenshi Angelique: Kokoro no Mezameru Toki (2006 TV series), Script (ep 4)
 Clannad (2007 film), Screenplay
 Shugo Chara! (2007 TV series), Script (ep 5, 10, 14, 15, 22, 28, 34, 39, 45, 49)
 Noramimi (2008 TV series), Series Composition
 Telepathy Shōjo Ran (2008 TV series), Series Composition, Screenplay
 Noramimi 2 (2008 TV series), Series Composition

Other works 
 Cheburashka (2010 series) as director and screenwriter.

References

External links
 

Japanese writers
Living people
Year of birth missing (living people)